Philine is a genus of sea slugs or sea snails, marine gastropod molluscs in the subfamily Philininae of the family Philinidae, the headshield slugs or paper bubbles.

Species
Species within the genus Philine include:

 Philine abyssicola Valdès, 2008
 Philine aethiopica Thiele, 1925
 Philine alboides Price, Gosliner & Valdés, 2011
 Philine amabilis Verrill, 1880
 Philine angasi Crosse and Fischer, 1865
 Philine angulata Jeffreys, 1867 - angled paper-bubble, angled paperbubble
 Philine aperta (Linnaeus, 1767)
 Philine approximans Dautzenberg & Fischer H., 1896
 Philine araneosa van der Linden, 1995
 Philine argentina Carcelles, 1947
 Philine auriformis Suter, 1909
 Philine azorica Bouchet, 1975
 Philine babai Valdés, 2008
 Philine bakeri Dall, 1919 
 Philine baxteri Valdés, Cadien & Gosliner, 2016
 Philine beachportensis Verco, 1909
 Philine berghi E. A. Smith, 1910
 Philine buchensis Caballer & Ortea, 2015
 Philine burrowsi Burn, 1961
 Philine caballeri Ortea, Espinosa & Moro, 2001
 Philine caledonica Risbec, 1951
 Philine candeana (d'Orbigny, 1841)
 Philine catena (Montagu, 1803)
 Philine cerebralis Malaquias, Ohnheiser, Oskars & Willassen, 2016
 Philine columnaria Hedley & May, 1908
 Philine complanata Watson, 1897
 Philine constricta Murdoch and Suter, 1906 
 Philine cumingii (Adams 1862)
 Philine denticulata (J. Adams, 1800)
 Philine dentiphallus Gonzales & Gosliner, 2014
 Philine elegans Bergh, 1905
 Philine exigua Challis, 1969
 Philine fenestra Price, Gosliner & Valdés, 2011
 Philine gelida van der Linden, 1995
 Philine guineensis Ev. Marcus & Er. Marcus, 1966
 Philine habei Valdés, 2008
 Philine harrisae Valdés, Cadien & Gosliner, 2016
 Philine hemphilli Dall, 1919
 Philine infortunata Pilsbry, 1895
 Philine infundibulum Dall, 1889
 Philine intricata Monterosato, 1875
 Philine iris Tringali, 2001
 Philine kinglipini Tchang, 1934
 Philine kurodai Habe, 1946
 Philine lucida Dall, 1927
 Philine malaquiasi Valdés, Cadien & Gosliner, 2016
 Philine mcleani Valdés, Cadien & Gosliner, 2016
 Philine mera Ev. Marcus & Er. Marcus, 1969
 Philine monilifera Bouchet, 1975
 Philine monterosati Monterosato, 1874
 Philine multipapillata Gonzales & Gosliner, 2014
 Philine orca Gosliner, 1988
 Philine orientalis A. Adams, 1854
 Philine multipapillata Gonzales & Gosliner, 2014
 Philine paucipapillata Price, Gosliner & Valdés, 2011
 Philine pittmani Gonzales & Gosliner, 2014
 Philine planata Dall, 1889
 Philine polystrigma (Dall, 1908)
 Philine powelli Rudman, 1870 
 Philine puka Price, Gosliner & Valdés, 2011
 Philine punctata (J. Adams, 1800)
 Philine quadripartita Ascanius, 1772
 Philine rubra Bergh, 1905 
 Philine rubrata Gosliner, 1988
 Philine rugosula Dautzenberg & Fischer H., 1896
 Philine sagra (d'Orbigny, 1841) - crenulate paper-bubble, crenulate paperbubble
 Philine sarcophaga Price, Gosliner & Valdés, 2011
 Philine scalpta Adams, 1862
 Philine schrammi Malaquias, Ohnheiser, Oskars & Willassen, 2016
 Philine sinuata Stimpson, 1851
 Philine striatula Monterosato, 1874
 Philine striolata A. Adams, 1862
 Philine talismani Sykes, 1905
 † Philine tepikia Rudman, 1970 
 Philine teres Hedley, 1903
 Philine tincta A. E. Verrill, 1882 - tinted paper-bubble, tinted paperbubble
 Philine trapezia Hedley, 1902
 Philine umbilicata Murdoch and Suter, 1906
 Philine vaillanti Issel, 1869
 Philine verdensis Gonzales & Gosliner, 2014
 Philine vestita (Philippi, 1840)
 Philine wareni Valdés, Cadien & Gosliner, 2016

Taxa inquirenda
 Philine acutangula A. Adams, 1862
 Philine desmotis Watson, 1897
 Philine minuta Thiele, 1925 
 Philine sykesii Melvill, 1904 
 Philine truncatissima G. B. Sowerby II, 1870 
 Philine vitrea Gould, 1859

 Species brought into synonymy
 Philine alata Thiele, 1912: synonym of Antarctophiline alata (Thiele, 1912) (original combination)
 Philine alba Mattox, 1958 - white paper-bubble, white paperbubble: synonym of Philinorbis albus (Mattox, 1958) (original combination)
 Philine alternans van der Linden, 1995: synonym of Laona alternans (van der Linden, 1995) (original combination)
 Philine antarctica Smith, 1902: synonym of Waegelea antarctica (E. A. Smith, 1902) (original combination)
 Philine apertissima Smith, 1902: synonym of Antarctophiline apertissima (E. A. Smith, 1902) (original combination)
 Philine apertissima de Folin, 1893: synonym of Philine quadripartita Ascanius, 1772
 Philine argentata Gould, 1859: synonym of Philine orientalis A. Adams, 1854
 Philine californica Willett, 1944 - California paper-bubble, California paperbubble : synonym of Laona californica (Willett, 1944) (original combination)
 Philine calva van der Linden, 1995: synonym of Philine striatula Monterosato, 1874
 Philine chilla Er. Marcus & Ev. Marcus, 1969: synonym of Laona chilla (Er. Marcus & Ev. Marcus, 1969) (original combination)
 Philine cingulata G. O. Sars, 1878 - girdled paper-bubble, girdled paperbubble : synonym of Philine finmarchica M. Sars, 1858
 Philine condensa van der Linden, 1995: synonym of Laona condensa (van der Linden, 1995) (original combination)
 Philine confusa Ohnheiser & Malaquias, 2013: synonym of Laona confusa (Ohnheiser & Malaquias, 2013)
 Philine falklandica A. W. B. Powell, 1951: synonym of Antarctophiline falklandica (Powell, 1951) (original combination)
 Philine fragilis G. O. Sars, 1878 - fragile paper-bubble, fragile paperbubble  : synonym of Philine finmarchica M. Sars, 1858: synonym of Praephiline finmarchica (M. Sars, 1859)
 Philine gibba (Strebel, 1908): synonym of Antarctophiline gibba (Strebel, 1908) (original combination)
 Philine gouldi Doello-Jurado, 1918: synonym of Antarctophiline gibba (Strebel, 1908) 
 Philine grandioculi Ohnheiser & Malaquias, 2013: synonym of Laona grandioculi (Ohnheiser & Malaquias, 2013)
 Philine indistincta Ohnheiser & Malaquias, 2013: synonym of Hermania indistincta (Ohnheiser & Malaquias, 2013) (original combination)
 Philine japonica Lischke, 1872: synonym of Philine orientalis A. Adams, 1854
 Philine kawamurai (Habe, 1958): synonym of Globophiline kawamurai Habe, 1958
 Philine kerguelensis Thiele, 1925: synonym of Spiraphiline kerguelensis (Thiele, 1925) (original combination)
 Philine laevissima M. Sars, 1859: synonym of Diaphana hiemalis (Couthouy, 1839)
 Philine lima (T. Brown, 1825) - file paper-bubble, file paperbubble: synonym of Retusophiline lima (T. Brown, 1827)
 Philine lineolata (Couthouy, 1839): synonym of Philine lima (T. Brown, 1825): synonym of Retusophiline lima (T. Brown, 1827)
 Philine loveni Malm, 1858: synonym of Philine scabra (O. F. Müller, 1784)
 Philine milneedwardsi Locard, 1897: synonym of Philine quadripartita Ascanius, 1772
 Philine monterosatoi Sykes, 1905: synonym of Philine monterosati Monterosato, 1874 (unjustified emendation)
 Philine ossiansarsi Friele, 1877: synonym of Philine finmarchica M. Sars, 1858
 Philine polaris Aurivillius, 1885 - axial paper-bubble, axial paperbubble: synonym of Philine quadrata (S. Wood, 1839)
 Philine pruinosa  (Clark, 1827): synonym of Laona pruinosa (W. Clark, 1827)
 Philine polystrigma (Dall, 1908): synonym of Woodbridgea polystrigma (Dall, 1908)
 Philine quadrata (S. V. Wood, 1839) - quadrate paper-bubble, quadrate paperbubble: synonym of Laona quadrata (S. Wood, 1839)
 Philine retifera (Forbes, 1844): synonym of Philine vestita (Philippi, 1840)
 Philine rugulosa (Dautzenberg & Fischer H., 1896): synonym of Philine rugosula Dautzenberg & Fischer H., 1896
 Philine scabra Muller, 1784: synonym of Hermania scabra (O. F. Müller, 1784)
 Philine sinuata Stimpson, 1851 - sinuate paper-bubble, sinuate paperbubble  : synonym of Philine denticulata (Adams J., 1800)
 Philine striatella Tapparone-Canefri, 1874 : synonym of Philine orientalis A. Adams, 1854
 Philine trachyostraca Watson, 1897: synonym of Philine retifera (Forbes, 1844)
 Philine thurmanni Ev. Marcus & Er. Marcus, 1969: synonym of Laona thurmanni (Ev. Marcus & Er. Marcus, 1969)
 Philine ventricosa (Jeffreys, 1865): synonym of Laona ventricosa (Jeffreys, 1865)

References

 Vaught, K.C. (1989). A classification of the living Mollusca. American Malacologists: Melbourne, FL (USA). . XII, 195 pp.
 Chaban E.M. & Soldatenko E.V. (2009) Description of a new genus Praephiline gen. nov. (Gastropoda: Opisthobranchia: Philinidae). Zoosystematica Rossica 18(2): 205-211.
 Price R.M., Gosliner T.M. & Valdés A. (2011) Systematics and phylogeny of Philine (Gastropoda: Opisthobranchia), with emphasis on the Philine aperta species complex. The Veliger 51(2): 1-58.

External links 

 
 Powell A. W. B., New Zealand Mollusca, William Collins Publishers Ltd, Auckland, New Zealand 1979 

Philinidae